Jovan Miladinović (30 January 1939 – 11 September 1982), commonly known as Zoran, was an association football player. He was born and died in Belgrade.

During his club career he played for FK Partizan and 1. FC Nürnberg. He earned 17 caps for the Yugoslavian national team and participated in the 1960 European Nations' Cup.

His entire coaching career was tied to FK Partizan, where he worked as assistant to various head coaches and filled in at the head position during two separate stints that lasted a few months. He was married and had two children.

References

External links 
 

1939 births
1982 deaths
Serbian footballers
Yugoslav footballers
Yugoslavia international footballers
1960 European Nations' Cup players
Olympic footballers of Yugoslavia
Footballers at the 1964 Summer Olympics
FK Partizan players
1. FC Nürnberg players
Yugoslav First League players
Bundesliga players
Serbian expatriate footballers
Yugoslav expatriate footballers
Expatriate footballers in West Germany
Expatriate footballers in Germany
Footballers from Belgrade
Serbian football managers
Yugoslav football managers
FK Partizan managers
Alcohol-related deaths in Serbia
Association football midfielders